Eleutherodactylus leprus is a species of frog in the family Eleutherodactylidae.

It is found in Belize, Guatemala, and Mexico.
Its natural habitat is subtropical or tropical moist lowland forests.
It is threatened by habitat loss.

References 

leprus
Amphibians described in 1879
Taxonomy articles created by Polbot